Lenz is an unincorporated community in Klamath County, Oregon, United States on U.S. Route 97, directly east of Crater Lake and  south of Chemult. This station on the Cascade Line of the Southern Pacific Railroad was named after Charles A. Lenz, who settled in the area before the turn of the 20th century. The elevation is 4554 feet (1388 m).

References

Unincorporated communities in Klamath County, Oregon
Unincorporated communities in Oregon